John Cunliffe may refer to:

John Cunliffe (author) (1933–2018), English author, creator of Postman Pat and Rosie & Jim
John Cunliffe (footballer born 1930) (1930–1975), English footballer
John Cunliffe (footballer born 1984), English footballer
John William Cunliffe (1865–1946), English author, former chairman of Columbia University

See also
Jack Cunliffe, rugby league footballer 
John Cunliffe Pickersgill-Cunliffe, British Member of Parliament
Jon Cunliffe, British civil servant